The Munich Marathon (also known as Generali Munich Marathon for sponsorship reasons) is an annual marathon road running event hosted by the city of Munich, Germany, usually in October, since 1983.  The event features a full marathon as well as a half marathon and 10K run.  The marathon is categorized as a Gold Label Road Race by World Athletics.

History 

Following the marathon races at the 1972 Munich Olympics, a number of shorter running events were held in the city every year.

In 1983, an annual marathon was established by Michael Schultz-Tholen's company (FVS) and was later jointly organised with the Munich Road Runners Club. The marathon followed the same course as the 1972 Olympic race, beginning in Coubertinplatz in Olympic Park Munich and finishing the last 300 Meters to the finish line in Olympic Stadium. The competition featured nearly 2000 finishers at its inaugural event and this quickly grew, reaching to over 6500 by the late 1980s. As well as the mass race, it attracted high level international competitors in elite races. Participation had a sudden decline after 1990 – going from 6340 finishers that year to 3360 six years later. This change resulted in the eventual bankruptcy of the parent company and its president Schultz-Tholen (who was a polo specialist with limited prior experience in the sector).

In 2000, the race was relaunched on a course outside the inner city, but its popularity returned only when the competition returned to the city streets and the Olympic stadium. Over five thousand people finished the race in 2001. The race established itself among Germany's largest footraces and had a record high of 9041 marathon finishers in 2004.

The 2006 event was the official German Marathon Championship race and Matthias Körner and Carmen Siewert were declared the men's and women's champions, respectively.  The event hosted the national marathon championship again in 2012, 2013, and 2014.

The 2020 in-person edition of the race was cancelled due to the coronavirus pandemic.

Course 

The course first heads south out of Olympiapark and then east along Elisabethstraße and Franz-Joseph-Straße until it intersects Leopoldstraße at Giselastraße station.  Runners then head south and west to hit Königsplatz and circle  before heading back north to Giselastraße station.  The marathon then heads northeast to enter Englischer Garten and nearly reaches its northern end before turning back southwest to exit the park near the Chinese Tower around the race's halfway point.

The marathon then returns to Olympiapark via Franz-Joseph-Straße and Elisabethstraße, and finishes inside Olympiastadion.

Winners 

The course records over the entire history of the city's marathons are held by Michael Kite of Kenya (2:09:46 hours in 2000) and Hungary's Karolina Szabó (2:33:09 hours in 1991).

Key:
  Course record (in bold)
  National championship race

Marathon

Half Marathon

10K

Notes

References

List of winners
Gasparovic, Juraj & Loonstra, Klaas (2011-10-10). Münich Median Marathon. Association of Road Racing Statisticians. Retrieved on 2011-10-28.

External links

Official website
Official times website

Marathons in Germany
Recurring sporting events established in 1983
Sports competitions in Munich
1983 establishments in West Germany
Annual sporting events in Germany
Autumn events in Germany